The 2010 Durango-Durango Emakumeen Saria was the sixth running of the Durango-Durango Emakumeen Saria, a women's bicycle race held annually in Spain. It took place on June 8, 2010, with Marianne Vos, Emma Johansson and Annemiek van Vleuten taking first, second and third place, respectively.

Durango-Durango Emakumeen Saria
2010 in women's road cycling
2010 in Spanish road cycling
June 2010 sports events in Europe